The Bible Broadcasting Network (BBN) is a listener-supported global Conservative Christian radio network staffed and headquartered in Charlotte, North Carolina. It was founded in 1971 by Lowell Davey, who was the network's president until his death in 2017. It remains under family control, with Davey's daughter Barbara Redemann and her husband Carl Redemann leading BBN.

BBN's mission statement is "to get the Word of God into the hearts and minds of as many people as possible using the most efficient means" and its motto is "Giving the Winds the Bible Voice". Doctrinally, the programming is conservative evangelical in approach. BBN eschews programming geared toward "signs and wonders", "charismatic" theology, and "prosperity theology". 

Programming content consists of traditional Christian music, including vocalists, choirs, and instrumentalists; Bible teaching and sermons; prayer times; children's and teens' programs; and family guidance programs.

Programs
Among the notable ministries having long-running programs on the network are: Running to Win and Moody Church Hour with Erwin Lutzer, Love Worth Finding by Adrian Rogers, Gateway to Joy by Elisabeth Elliot, and the Pacific Garden Mission's radio drama, Unshackled!. Reruns of the Children's Bible Hour and Sugar Creek Gang radio plays are heard daily on the afternoon Captain’s Club program. Adventures in Odyssey, one of the most popular Christian radio shows in the U.S., is aired for teens and preteens.

Founding
The network was founded in 1971 by Lowell Davey (July 22, 1933–February 18, 2017). Hailing from Minnesota, he had previously served in the U.S. Air Force. Upon completing his enlistment, Davey attended Bob Jones University.

Davey entered the field of Christian radio broadcasting when he acquired a bankrupt radio station, WYFI, in Norfolk, Virginia, on March 28, 1969. The station began broadcasting under his ownership on October 2, 1971, at 5 p.m. BBN was still headquartered in Chesapeake, Virginia, when it bought Charlotte radio station WSOC (AM), which became WYFQ (AM).

Stations
BBN owns and operates 52 full-power stations and 97 low-power translators in 32 states and Bermuda, distributed by satellite.  According to the network's website, they also operate AM and FM radio stations in 14 countries of North and South America. BBN also broadcasts around the world full-time via streaming on the Internet in eight languages: English, Spanish, Portuguese, Mandarin Chinese, Korean, Japanese, German, and Russian.

Stations in italics are not owned by Bible Broadcasting Network, Inc., but broadcast BBN programming.

Translators
In addition to its full-power stations, BBN is relayed by 97 translators to widen its broadcast area.

References

External links
 

 
American radio networks
Christian radio stations in the United States
Radio stations established in 1971
1971 establishments in North Carolina
Radio broadcasting companies of the United States